South Central Hella is the seventh album by American rap group South Central Cartel, consisted of Austin "Big Prodeje" Patterson, Patrick "Young Prodeje" Pitts and Larry "LV" Sanders.

Track listing 
 Intro (featuring Paul "Paybacc" Brown)
 Don't Trip
 Yea Baby
 Famous
 Hit It in My Chuccz
 Do It Movin
 Body Shots
 Thug the Club (featuring Tha Floc Gang)
 Welcome to L.A.
 So Many Words
 First Time (featuring Young Dee)
 Oh (featuring Mel-Low)
 Staccin My Papers
 Comin Up (featuring Angelic)
 Playing Games (featuring Gangsta Wayne)
 Get Money
 Niggaz in da Hood (featuring Tha Floc Gang)
 It Aint Worth It (featuring Bokie Loc)

2003 albums
South Central Cartel albums
Albums produced by Prodeje